Digman! is an upcoming American animated sitcom created by Neil Campbell and Andy Samberg. Samberg stars in the titular role as a celebrity archaeologist along with Tim Robinson, Tim Meadows, Melissa Fumero, Guz Khan, Mitra Jouhari, and Dale Soules. The series will premiere on March 22, 2023 on Comedy Central.

Premise
"Digman! is set in a world where archaeologists are celebrities, with Samberg voicing protagonist Rip Digman."

Cast and characters

Main
 Andy Samberg as Rip Digman, an adventurer. Samberg voices Digman in an accent based on that of Nicolas Cage.
 Mitra Jouhari as Saltine
 Tim Robinson as Swooper
 Tim Meadows
 Melissa Fumero
 Guz Khan as Zane 
 Dale Soules as Agatha

Guest
 Andrew Daly
 Harvey Guillén
 Maya Rudolph
 Claudia O'Doherty
 Lennon Parham
 Joe Lo Truglio
 Jane Lynch
 Kyle Mooney
 Daniel Radcliffe
 Edgar Wright
 Cole Escola
 Lauren Lapkus
 Paul Rust
 Marc Evan Jackson
 Kerri Kenney
 Clancy Brown
 Rachel Kaly
 Carl Tart
 Kirby Howell-Baptiste

Episodes

Production
Digman! was co-written and co-created by Andy Samberg and Neil Campbell, who was co-executive producer for Brooklyn Nine-Nine. The series is the first written and produced by Samberg, who also stars. It is produced by CBS Studios, Party Over Here, and Titmouse with executive producers Ali Bell, Chris Prynoski, Shannon Prynoski, Antonio Canobbio, and Ben Kalina.

On September 14, 2022 the series regular cast members were announced: Tim Robinson, Mitra Jouhari, Dale Soules, Guz Khan, Melissa Fumero, and Tim Meadows. Fumero was Samberg's co-star on Brooklyn Nine-Nine, and Meadows was a guest star. Several guest cast members were announced on February 13, 2023 including Maya Rudolph, Daniel Radcliffe, Jane Lynch, Edgar Wright, Kyle Mooney, Cole Escola, Lauren Lapkus, Paul Rust, Joe Lo Truglio, Marc Evan Jackson, Harvey Guillén, Claudia O'Doherty, Kerri Kenney, Clancy Brown, Rachel Kaly, Andy Daly, Lennon Parham, Carl Tart and Kirby Howell-Baptiste.

Release
Digman! is scheduled to premiere on March 22, 2023 on Comedy Central.

References

External links 
 

2023 American television series debuts
2020s American adult animated television series
2020s American animated comedy television series
Television series by CBS Studios
Upcoming television series
Upcoming animated television series
Comedy Central animated television series